The Deanery of Christianity is a deanery in the Anglican Diocese of Lincoln in England immediately around the city of Lincoln. The deanery takes the name "Christianity" because there is a tradition that a diocese and a deanery should not share the same name.

Parishes
  
Lincoln St Botolph
Boultham St Helen
Boultham St Matthew 
Bracebridge, All Saints
Lincoln St Giles
Lincoln St Faith
Lincoln St Mary le Wigford
Lincoln St Nicholas
Lincoln St Matthias 
Lincoln St Peter in Eastgate
Lincoln St Annes Chapel 
Lincoln St Mary Magdalene with Saint Paul in the Bail
Lincoln St Peter at Gowts 
Lincoln All Saints
Lincoln St Swithin's
Birchwood St Luke
Bracebridge Heath St John the Evangelist
Lincoln St John
Lincoln St George's, Swallowbeck

Diocese of Lincoln
Deaneries of the Church of England